The United Nations Association Wales (UNA Wales) is an organisation campaigning in Wales to make the ideals of the United Nations a reality. It campaigns, lobbies and raises awareness on issues of disarmament, conflict prevention, sustainable development and human rights. It aims to promote informed debate on international issues, including the UN system itself.

UNA Wales is based at the Temple of Peace, Cardiff and is affiliated with the Welsh Centre for International Affairs.

See also
 Temple of Peace, Cardiff
 United Nations
 United Nations Association UK
 Welsh Centre for International Affairs

External links
 Information about UNA Wales

Organisations based in Cardiff
World Federation of United Nations Associations
Foreign relations of the United Kingdom